Elrom Airways was an airline based in Tel Aviv, Israel. It operated domestic scheduled flights from Sde Dov Airport, Tel Aviv to Ein Yahav Airfield.

Fleet 
The Elrom Airways fleet consisted of the following aircraft as of June 2008:

References

External links 
 Elrom website
 Elrom Aviation fleet at Tel Aviv SDE DOV

Defunct airlines of Israel
Airlines established in 1990
Airlines disestablished in 2012